Trương Ke Nhon (born 1 January 1939) is a Vietnamese former swimmer. He competed in the men's 200 metre breaststroke at the 1960 Summer Olympics.

References

External links
 

1939 births
Living people
Vietnamese male swimmers
Olympic swimmers of Vietnam
Swimmers at the 1960 Summer Olympics
People from Bạc Liêu Province
Southeast Asian Games medalists in swimming
Southeast Asian Games gold medalists for Vietnam
Southeast Asian Games bronze medalists for Vietnam
Competitors at the 1959 Southeast Asian Peninsular Games
Competitors at the 1961 Southeast Asian Peninsular Games
Male breaststroke swimmers
20th-century Vietnamese people
21st-century Vietnamese people